Frank Gray (born 1954) is a British football player and manager.

Francis or Frank Gray may also refer to:
Frank Gray (researcher) (1887–1969), American physicist, remembered for the Gray code, a binary numeral system
Frank Gray (politician) (1880–1935), British Liberal Member of Parliament for Oxford, 1922–1924
Frank Gray (cricketer) (1873–1947), cricketer 
Frank Gray Jr. (1908–1978), U.S. federal judge
Frank Fellows Gray (1863–1935), Boy Scouts pioneer 
Frank Gray (rugby league) (1905–1993), Australian rugby player
Francis Calley Gray (1790–1856), politician from Massachusetts
Francis Gray, 14th Lord Gray (1765–1842), Scottish peer, politician and soldier
Francis Campbell Gray, bishop of the Episcopal Diocese of Northern Indiana

See also 
Frank Grey (disambiguation)
Frances Grey (disambiguation) for the female version of the name